Orane Demazis (4 September 1894 – 25 December 1991) was a French actress.

Biography
Born Henriette Marie Louise Burgart in Oran, French Algeria, in a family of Alsatian origin, Demazis entered the Paris Conservatoire National Supérieur d'Art Dramatique in 1919. She formed her stage name after her birthplace of Oran and the name of Mazis, another nearby town. Upon graduating in 1922, she joined the Théâtre de l'Atelier cast directed by Charles Dullin. Between 1922 and 1926, she starred in Carmosine by Alfred de Musset, L'Occasion by Prosper Mérimée, Chacun sa vérité by Pirandello, Petite Lumière et l'Ourse and Huon de Bordeaux by Alexandre Arnoux, Voulez-vous jouer avec moâ by Marcel Achard.

Her encounter with Marcel Pagnol in 1923 marked a turning point in her career, he created some of her most famous roles and in 1933 they had a son, Jean-Pierre Burgart. In 1926, he hired her to act in his play Jazz before creating for her the role of Fanny in Marius (1929) then Fanny (1931), and Caesar (1936).

Filmography

 1931 : Marius by Alexander Korda as Fanny
 1932 : Fanny by Marc Allégret as Fanny
 1934 : Angèle by Marcel Pagnol as Angèle
 1934 : Les Misérables by Raymond Bernard as Éponine Thénardier
 1936 : César by Marcel Pagnol as Fanny
 1937 : Harvest (Regain) by Marcel Pagnol as Arsule
 1938 : Heartbeat (Le Schpountz) by Marcel Pagnol as Françoise
 1938 : Le Moulin dans le soleil by Marc Didier
 1939 : Fire in the Straw (Le Feu de paille) by Jean Benoît-Lévy
 1942 : Le Mistral by Jacques Houssin
 1948 : Bagarres by Henri Calef
 1952 : The Blonde Gypsy (La Caraque blonde) by Jacqueline Audry
 1957 : Jusqu'au dernier by Pierre Billon
 1957 : The Case of Doctor Laurent by Jean-Paul Le Chanois as Madame Escalin
 1958 : Police judiciaire by Maurice de Canonge
 1968 : Au pan coupé by Guy Gilles
 1973 : Rude Journée pour la reine by René Allio as Catherine
 1974 : Le Fantôme de la liberté by Luis Buñuel as La mère du premier préfet de police
 1975 : Souvenirs d'en France by André Téchiné as Augustine
 1979 : Bastien et Bastienne by Michel Andrieu as Georgette
 1980 : La Naissance du jour by Jacques Demy as Sido

External links 
 

1894 births
1991 deaths
People from Oran
French stage actresses
French film actresses
20th-century French actresses
Pieds-Noirs